Sir Richard Valentine Nind Hopkins, GCB, PC (13 February 1880 – 30 March 1955) was a British civil servant. Born in 1880 to businessman Alfred Nind Hopkins and Eliza Mary Castle, Hopkins was educated at King Edward's School, Birmingham and Emmanuel College, Cambridge. First serving with the Board of Inland Revenue, 'Hoppy' was appointed chairman in 1922. In 1927 Hopkins was transferred to the Treasury, where he became the Permanent Secretary to the Treasury in 1942 and served in that position until 1945. He is credited with the (re)introduction of economist John Maynard Keynes in the Treasury during the Second World War, whose influence proved to be essential in many economic policy decisions (Middleton 2004).

References 

 
 John Maynard Keynes: Fighting for Britain 1937-1946 (published in the United States as Fighting for Freedom), Robert Skidelsky, Papermac, 2001, 

1880 births
1955 deaths
Alumni of Emmanuel College, Cambridge
Permanent Secretaries of HM Treasury
Chairmen of the Board of Inland Revenue
Members of the Privy Council of the United Kingdom